Shushank Mainali() is a Nepalese film actor and producer. His film Talakjung vs Tulke was selected as Nepal's official entry to the 88th Academy Awards in the best foreign language film category.

Early career
Shushank began his career appearing in small roles and cameos in Nepali serials, music videos and films before his role as the main leading actor in the film Saanghuro. Saanghuro was also telecasted on British television Channel 4.

Filmography
Saanghuro (2013)
Talakjung vs Tulke (2014)
Santras (2014)
Ko Aafno (2015)
Junge (2015)

References

1980 births
Living people
Nepalese male film actors
Nepalese film producers
Actors from Kathmandu